Pallin is a surname. It may refer to:

Adam Pallin, American record producer, songwriter and multi-instrumentalist
Paddy Pallin, Australian bushwalking and camping equipment retailer
Paddy Pallin ski classic, a cross country ski event
Rob Pallin, American professional ice hockey coach

See also
Palin

Surnames